Bruno Miguel Duarte Paixão (born 28 May 1974, in Setúbal) is a Portuguese football referee. He has been a FIFA international referee since 2004.

References

1974 births
Portuguese football referees
Living people
Sportspeople from Setúbal